Milica Starović (born 19 May 1988 in Novi Sad, Serbia) is a Serbian female sprint canoer.

She represented Serbia at the 2016 Summer Olympics and at the 2020 Summer Olympics.
Starović won gold medal at the 2015 European Games in K-2 500 m with Dalma Ružičić-Benedek.

References

Living people
Sportspeople from Novi Sad
Serbian female canoeists
1988 births
European Games medalists in canoeing
European Games gold medalists for Serbia
Canoeists at the 2015 European Games
Canoeists at the 2019 European Games
Canoeists at the 2016 Summer Olympics
Olympic canoeists of Serbia
European champions for Serbia
Mediterranean Games gold medalists for Serbia
Mediterranean Games bronze medalists for Serbia
Competitors at the 2013 Mediterranean Games
Competitors at the 2018 Mediterranean Games
Mediterranean Games medalists in canoeing
ICF Canoe Sprint World Championships medalists in kayak
Universiade medalists in canoeing
Universiade bronze medalists for Serbia
Medalists at the 2013 Summer Universiade
Canoeists at the 2020 Summer Olympics